Biathlon at the 1998 Winter Paralympics consisted of twelve events, eight for men and four for women.

Medal table

Medal summary 
The competition event was:
7.5 km: men - women

The event had separate standing, sitting, or visually impaired classifications:

LW2 - standing: single leg amputation above the knee
LW3 - standing: double leg amputation below the knee, mild cerebral palsy, or equivalent impairment
LW4 - standing: single leg amputation below the knee
LW5/7 - standing: double arm amputation
LW6/8 - standing: single arm amputation
LW9 - standing: amputation or equivalent impairment of one arm and one leg
LW 10 - sitting: paraplegia with no or some upper abdominal function and no functional sitting balance
LW 11 - sitting: paraplegia with fair functional sitting balance
LW 12 - sitting: double leg amputation above the knees, or paraplegia with some leg function and good sitting balance
B1 - visually impaired: no functional vision
B2 - visually impaired: up to ca 3-5% functional vision
B3 - visually impaired: under 10% functional vision

Men's events

Women's events

See also
Biathlon at the 1998 Winter Olympics

References 

 

 Winter Sport Classification, Canadian Paralympic Committee

1998 Winter Paralympics events
1998
Paralympics
Biathlon competitions in Japan